Söderköpings IK is a Swedish football club located in Söderköping in Östergötland County.

Background
The eight founders of Söderköpings Idrottssällskap had a vision when they founded the club with confectioner Paul Granander on 12 December 1917 to develop sports and obtain a home ground. This primary objective was achieved in spring 1920 when Vikingavallen was opened. On 13 April 1936 some enterprising young people met in Centralkafeèt in Söderköping and formed Drothems IK which was later named IK Ramunder.

Some 86 years later on 15 January 2004 Söderköpings Idrottsklubb was formed following the merger of Söderköpings IS and IK Ramunder.  The visions of the original founders lives on with the natural development of a strong Söderköping sports club.

Since their foundation Söderköpings IK has participated mainly in the middle divisions of the Swedish football league system.  The club currently plays in Division 3 Nordöstra Götaland which is the fifth tier of Swedish football. They play their home matches at the Vikingavallen in Söderköping.

Söderköpings IK are affiliated to Östergötlands Fotbollförbund.

Recent history
In recent seasons Söderköpings IK have competed in the following divisions:

2013 – Division III, Nordöstra Götaland
2012 – Division III, Nordöstra Götaland
2011 – Division III, Nordöstra Götaland
2010 – Division III, Nordöstra Götaland
2009 – Division III, Nordöstra Götaland
2008 – Division III, Nordöstra Götaland
2007 – Division IV, Östergötland Östra
2006 – Division IV, Östergötland Östra
2005 – Division IV, Östergötland Östra
2004 – Division III, Västra Svealand

In recent seasons Söderköpings IK have had the following average attendances:

Players

Current squad

Footnotes

External links 
 Söderköpings IK – Official website
 Söderköpings IK Facebook

Football clubs in Östergötland County
Association football clubs established in 2004
2004 establishments in Sweden